Abdurrahman Vazirov Khalil oglu (26 May 1930 – 10 January 2022) was the 13th First Secretary of the Azerbaijan Communist Party and the leader of the Azerbaijan SSR from 1988 till January 1990.

Vazirov was appointed by Kremlin to lead Soviet Azerbaijan in May 1988, amidst the heating of the Nagorno-Karabakh conflict. Vazirov replaced Kamran Baghirov, whose dismissal came along with similar dismissal of Karen Demirchyan and appointment of Suren Harutyunyan as the leader of the Armenian SSR.

He was a Soviet diplomat, who served in India, Nepal and Pakistan. He had been out of the Azerbaijan SSR for over a decade and therefore was untainted by the corruption. He was neither a typical political boss nor a local nationalist; he could not even speak fluent Azerbaijani. But at the same time, Vazirov was born in Nagorno-Karabakh region of Azerbaijan SSR.

Vazirov shared Mikhail Gorbachev's internationalist values and aspirations for political reform but he could not cope effectively with the complex political situation in Azerbaijan. He was also known as a fierce opponent of the former leader of Soviet Azerbaijan and later the 3rd president of independent Azerbaijan, Heydar Aliyev.

He left Azerbaijan SSR amidst the Black January events in Baku, for which he was later sought by the Parliament of Azerbaijan as one of the responsible parties. On 24 January 1990, he was replaced in his position by Ayaz Mutallibov.

Vazirov died on 10 January 2022, at the age of 91.

References

External links
 YouTube интервью Paxlava Production - Везиров: о дружбе с Гагариным, "письме Алиеву" и Карабахе

1930 births
2022 deaths
Politicians from Baku
First secretaries of the Azerbaijan Communist Party
Azerbaijan State Oil and Industry University alumni
Communist Party of the Soviet Union members
Eighth convocation members of the Supreme Soviet of the Soviet Union
Recipients of the Order of Friendship of Peoples
Recipients of the Order of the Red Banner of Labour
Ambassadors of the Soviet Union to Pakistan
Azerbaijani atheists
Azerbaijani expatriates in Pakistan
Azerbaijani memoirists
Soviet diplomats
Vazirovs